Star for a Night was a British television talent show. It was originally commissioned as a one-off special on 26 June 1999, but was soon commissioned as a series and ran from 8 January 2000 to 20 October 2001. It was presented by Jane McDonald. The judges were Nigel Martin-Smith and Barbara Windsor.

Overview

Series

Special

References

External links

Star for a Night at BFI

1999 British television series debuts
2001 British television series endings
BBC Television shows